A Haunting Curse is the third studio album by American extreme metal band Goatwhore.

A live performance music video was filmed for the song "Forever Consumed Oblivion", which has seen airplay on MTV2's Headbangers Ball. Another music video was filmed for "Alchemy of the Black Sun Cult".

Track listing

Personnel 
Ben Falgoust – lead vocals
Sammy Duet – guitars, backing vocals
Nathan Bergeron – bass, backing vocals
Zack Simmons – drums

References 

2006 albums
Goatwhore albums
Metal Blade Records albums
Albums with cover art by Jacob Bannon
Albums produced by Erik Rutan